Chinobod (also known as Chinabad) is a town in Baliqchi District, Andijan Region, Uzbekistan. Its population is 24,000 (2016).

References

External links
Andijan.uz

Populated places in Andijan Region
Urban-type settlements in Uzbekistan